Black Duck River may refer to:

Canada
Black Duck River (Manitoba–Ontario)
Black Duck River (Newfoundland and Labrador)
United States
Black Duck River (Minnesota)

See also
Blackduck River, in Minnesota, United States
Duck River (disambiguation)